Selenophorus hylacis is a species of ground beetle in the family Carabidae. It is found in North America.

References

Further reading

 
 
 
 
 

Harpalinae
Beetles of North America
Beetles described in 1823
Taxa named by Thomas Say